The 1934/1935 USSR Chess Championship was the 9th edition of USSR Chess Championship. Held from 7 December 1934 to 2 January 1935 in Leningrad. The tournament was won by Grigory Levenfish and Ilya Rabinovich. Mikhail Botvinnik did not participate because on the same date he was abroad playing the Hastings Tournament.

Table and results

References 

USSR Chess Championships
Championship
Chess
1934 in chess
1935 in chess
Chess